Pestalotiopsis guepini is a fungal plant pathogen infecting rhododendrons.

References

External links
 USDA ARS Fungal Database

Fungal plant pathogens and diseases
Ornamental plant pathogens and diseases
guepini